Pullen is an uncommon English surname with a purported Norman origin.

"Pullen" is likely an occupational name, arising from the Old French word poulain.

There are several variants of "Pullen", including Pullin, Pullins, Pulleyn, Pullan and Pullein, the latter being the earliest recorded version (1166).

Apart from the English surname "Pullen", there is a very common surname "Pullan" in India.

The surname is shared by these notable people:

 Alex Pullin (1987–2020), Australian snowboarder
 Andrew John Pullan (1963–2012), New Zealand mathematician
 Benjamin Pulleyne, also spelt Pullan (died 1861), Church of England clergyman and schoolmaster 
 Cecil Pullan (1910–1970), Indian-born English cricket player
 Cyril Pullin (1893–1973), English inventor, engineer and motorcycle race driver
 Deborah Pullen (1963–2010), New Zealand female international football (soccer) player
 Don Pullen (1941–1995), American jazz musician
 Erica Pullins (born 1983), American musician
 Frank Pullen (1915–1992), English businessperson and racehorse owner
 Hartley Pullan (1899–1968), World War I flying ace
 Henry Pulleine (bef. 1850–1879), British Army administrator during the Anglo-Zulu War
 Henry William Pullen (1836–1903), English cleric and writer
 Jacob Pullen (born 1989), American basketball player
 James Henry Pullen (1835–1916), aka "Genius of Earlswood Asylum", British autistic savant
 John Pullin (1941–2021), English rugby union player
 Jorge Pullin (born 1963), Argentine-American physics academic
 Josiah Pullen (1631–1714), English vicar
 Kent Pullen (1942–2003), American politician
 Lloyd T. Pullen (1825–1908), American politician
 Lucy Pullen, Canadian artist
 Matilda Marian Pullan (1819–1862), British author
 Melanie Pullen (born 1975), American photographer
 Melanie Clark Pullen (born 1977), Irish actress, producer and writer
 Mieke Pullen (1957–2003), Dutch long-distance runner
 Penny Pullen, American politician
 Peter Pullan (1857–1901), English cricket player
 Purv Pullen (1909–1992), American actor
 Richard Popplewell Pullan (1825–1888), English architect and archæologist
 Robert Pullen (died c.1150), English theologian and official of the Roman Catholic Church
 Sidney Pullen (1895–1950s), English football (soccer) player
 Tessa Pullan (born 1954), sculptor, equestrian artist
 Tobias Pullen (1648–1713), Irish bishop
 Tom Pullen (born 1945), Canadian football (gridiron) player
 Wally Pullen (1919–1977), English footballer
 Vern Pullens (1929–2001), American rockabilly and country singer
 William Pullen "Admiral Pullen" (1813–1887), Royal Navy officer and Arctic explorer
 William Pullen (cricketer) (1866–1937), an English cricket player

See also 
Pullen House, a plantation house in Raleigh, North Carolina

References